

Plants

Cnidarians

Newly described cnidarians

Arthropods

Bryozoans

Newly described bryozoans

Brachiopods

Molluscs

Echinoderms

Conodonts

Newly described conodonts

Fishes

Amphibians

Basalmost tetrapods

Temnospondyls

Research
 Specimens of Micromelerpeton crederni with abnormalities in their limbs interpreted as a result of limb regeneration are described by Fröbisch, Bickelmann and Witzmann (2014).
 Redescription of Mahavisaurus dentatus and Lyrosaurus australis and a study on the phylogenetic relationships of the rhytidosteids is published by Maganuco, Pasini & Auditore (2014).

New taxa

Chroniosuchians

Lissamphibians

Research
 The humerus bone of a large calyptocephalellid anuran, apparently one of the largest fossil anurans known to date, is described by Otero et al. (2014) from the Eocene of Chile.

New taxa

Reptiles

Synapsids

Non-mammalian synapsids

Research
 A study on the diel activity patterns of non-mammalian synapsids is published by Angielczyk & Schmitz (2014).
 The presence of plicidentine (infolded dentine around the base of the tooth root) is reported in the maxillary and dentary teeth of Ianthodon, Sphenacodon, Secodontosaurus and Dimetrodon by Brink, LeBlanc & Reisz (2014).
 A study of the anatomy of nasal cavity of Brasilitherium riograndensis is published by Ruf et al. (2014).
 A study of the anatomy of the therocephalian Simorhinella baini and a taxonomic re-evaluation of the family Lycosuchidae is published by Abdala et al. (2014).

New taxa

Mammals

Other animals

Other organisms

References

 
2010s in paleontology
Paleontology